The Sino-American Mutual Defense Treaty (SAMDT), formally Mutual Defense Treaty between the United States of America and the Republic of China, was a defense pact signed between the United States and the Republic of China (Taiwan) effective from 1955 to 1980. It was intended to defend the island of Taiwan from invasion by the People's Republic of China. Some of its content was carried over to the Taiwan Relations Act of 1979 after the failure of the Goldwater v Carter lawsuit.

Background
In the context of Cold War confrontation between capitalist countries and communist countries worldwide, the SAMDT between the United States of America and the Republic of China was intended to secure the island of Taiwan from potential invasion by the People's Republic of China (Red China) in the aftermath of the Chinese Civil War on Mainland China.

Rather than taking a multilateral approach to alliances and treaties in East Asia, as had been done in Europe with NATO, the U.S. decided on a bilateral approach with its Asian allies (Philippines, China (Republic of), Japan and South Korea), known as the San Francisco System or hubs-and-spokes system. Because the politics in Asia ranged from democratic to authoritarian, it would be difficult to find a base for multilateral relations stemming from shared values. Furthermore, the countries in Asia were not perceived to face a single threat, unlike western Europe from the Soviet Union. It was therefore considered more beneficial to pursue bilateral relations.

The treaty was signed on December 2, 1954, in Washington, D.C. and came into force on March 3, 1955.

The treaty supported the Republic of China in asserting legitimacy as the sole government of the whole of mainland China until the early 1970s. During the Cold War, the treaty also helped US policymakers to shape the policy of containment in East Asia together with South Korea and Japan against the potential spread of communism.

Obligations

The treaty consists of ten main articles. The content of the treaty included the provision that if one country came under attack, the other would aid and provide military support.

The treaty was limited in application to the defense of the island of Taiwan and the Pescadores only. Kinmen and Matsu were not protected by this treaty. Therefore, the US stood aside during the Second Taiwan Strait Crisis. The treaty also discouraged the Republic of China from initiating any military action against mainland China, since only Taiwan and Pescadores were included and unilateral military actions not supported.

From the viewpoint of US Senate, in conjunction with the ratification of the MDT, a report issued Feb. 8, 1955, by the US Senate Committee on Foreign Relations specified: "It is the view of the committee that the coming into force of the present treaty will not modify or affect the existing legal status of Formosa and the Pescadores."

To avoid any possibility of misunderstanding on this aspect of the treaty, the committee decided it would be useful to include in this report the following statement:

It is the understanding of the Senate that nothing in the treaty shall be construed as affecting or modifying the legal status or sovereignty of the territories to which it applies.

Impact
  The relationship between the US and the Soviet Union has eased, and the US does not support a "counterattack on the mainland." The Republic of China Armed Forces continued to counterattack on a small scale, with more defeats and less victory. As a result, the national army missed three major opportunities (the Great Leap Forward in 1958, the Sino-Indian border conflict in 1962, and the Cultural Revolution in 1966), which completely stifled the hope of the Republic of China government to counterattack the mainland. 
  The benefits of this treaty are not limited to Taiwan and the United States, but extend to the entire Western Pacific, which is slightly different from the US-Japan Cooperation and Security Treaty and the US–Philippines Mutual Defense Treaty. 
  The basic spirit of this treaty is anti-Communist. It not only assists in defense of Taiwan in military force, but also prevents communism from infiltrating Taiwan. 
  The treaty stipulates that, in addition to self-defense, military actions taken by the Republic of China on Taiwan against mainland China should also comply with restrictions agreed by the United States. Truman restored the policy of neutrality across the Taiwan Strait to a certain extent. 
  Prevent the CCP from attacking Taiwan and establish the situation of long-term division of both sides of the Taiwan Strait. U.S. troops stationed in Taiwan to establish military security to ensure Taiwan’s development and turn Taiwan’s crisis into peace. 
  The nature of this treaty includes political, military, economic and social welfare, and it is a multi-purpose treaty.

Termination
Although the treaty had no time limit, Article 10 of the treaty stipulated that either party can terminate the treaty one year after notifying the other party. Accordingly, the treaty came to an end on January 1, 1980, one year after the United States established diplomatic relations with the People's Republic of China on January 1, 1979.

The authority for President Jimmy Carter to unilaterally annul a treaty, in this case the SAMDT, was the topic of the Supreme Court case Goldwater v. Carter in which the court declined to rule on the legality of this action on jurisdictional grounds, thereby allowing it to proceed.

Taiwan Relations Act

Shortly after the United States' recognition of the People's Republic of China, the U.S. Congress passed the Taiwan Relations Act. Some of the SAMDT's content survives in the Act; for example the definition of "Taiwan". However, it falls short of promising Taiwan direct military assistance in case of an invasion.

See also

 Battle of Guningtou
 Political status of Taiwan
 Sino-American Cooperative Organization, during World War II
 United States Taiwan Defense Command
 Taiwan Relations Act
 Taiwan Travel Act of 2018

References

External links
Mutual Defense Treaty Between the United States of America and the Republic of China; December 2, 1954

Cold War treaties
Cold War alliances and military strategy
Taiwan–United States military relations
Treaties concluded in 1954
Treaties entered into force in 1955
Treaties of the Republic of China (1949–1971)
Treaties of the United States
Treaties of Taiwan
1955 establishments in the United States
Military alliances involving the United States